Vincent L. Griffith is the former director of Defense Logistics Agency operations, served over thirty years in United States Navy at various posts such as commander of the Naval Supply Systems Command, Global Logistics Support, and later, director of DLA Aviation, commanding officer of the United States Fleet Forces Command for Norfolk, Virginia, and rear admiral in the U.S. navy before his retirement to the service in 2017. Government of United States conferred numerous awards upon Vincent, including Defense Superior Service Medal, Legion of Merit, Defense Meritorious Service Medal, Meritorious Service Medals, and five Commendation Medals.

Prior to his rear admiral post, he served supply officer of a fleet ballistic missile submarine and two aircraft carriers such as USS Stonewall Jackson, USS Saratoga and USS John C. Stennis. Griffith was also serving at navy ship Charleston Naval Shipyard for South Carolina and Naval Supply Systems Command unit for Washington, D.C.

Biography 
In 1981, Griffith graduated from Berry College where he did bachelor's degree in Business administration. Later, he attended George Washington University and did MBA. After completing bachelor's and master's degree, he then went to a private research university in Atlanta, Emory University and did Advanced Management Program. Griffith also attended University of Virginia where he did Navy Corporate Business Course. In 1982, he was commissioned with a junior rank of a commissioned officerEnsign in the Navy Supply Corps.

References

External links
Vincent L. Griffith at U.S. Department of Defense

Living people
Date of birth missing (living people)
Place of birth missing (living people)
Year of birth missing (living people)
Berry College alumni
George Washington University School of Business alumni
United States Navy rear admirals (upper half)